Saleh or Salih (or ) is an Arabic masculine given name which means "Pious".

Given name
 Saleh, Arabian prophet
 Salih ibn Ali (711–769 CE), was the Abbasid general and governor in Syria and Egypt.
 Salih ibn Harun al-Rashid, was the son of Abbasid caliph Harun al-Rashid, His mother was Ri'm.
 Saleh Abdul Aziz Al Rajhi, Saudi Arabian businessman
 Saleh Abdelaziz Al-Haddad (born 1986), Kuwaiti long jumper
 Saleh Abdelaziz Al-Haddad (born 1986), Kuwaiti long jumper
 Saleh Abdelaziz Al-Haddad (born 1986), Kuwaiti long jumper
 Salih Ashmawi (1910–1983), Egyptian politician
 Salih Bozok (1881–1941), Turkish military officer
 Salih Dursun, Turkish footballer
 Salih Güney, Turkish film actor
 Saleh and Daoud Al-Kuwaity, Iraqi musician
 Saleh al-Mutlaq, Iraqi politician
 Salih Muslim Muhammad, Rojava politician
 Salih Neftçi, Turkish financial economist
 Salih Omurtak, Turkish general
 Salih Özcan, Turkish footballer
 Salih Pasha (disambiguation), various Ottoman people
 Salih Sadir, Iraqi footballer
 Salih Uçan, Turkish footballer
 Salih Hudayar,Uyghur prime-minister of government

Surname
 Abdul Azis Saleh
 Abdul Rahman Saleh, Indonesian aviator and physician
 Adam Saleh, American YouTube personality
 Ahmad Ali Abdullah Saleh, Yemeni military commander
 Ali Abdullah Saleh, former President of Yemen
 Allah-Yar Saleh, Iranian politician
 Amrullah Saleh, former Vice President and 16th de jure president of Afghanistan 
 Anas Khalid Al Saleh (born 1972), Kuwaiti politician
 Barham Salih, president (2018) of Iraq
 Farhan Saleh, Lebanese writer and militant
 Hashim Saleh, Omani footballer
 Jahanshah Saleh, Iranian physician
 Muhammad Salih, 18th-century Bengali Islamic scholar
 Raden Saleh, Indonesian painter
 Robert Saleh, American, NFL football coach
 Sania Saleh (1935–1985), Syrian poet
 Tayeb Salih, Sudanese author

Fictional characters 
 Saleh, powerful and wise mage from Fire Emblem: Sacred Stones
 Salih Koçovalı, alternate name for Vartolu Sadettin in the Turkish television program Çukur
Saleh, major antagonist in Tales of Rebirth 
 Salleh, a minor character in the Malasyan cartoon Upin & Ipin
Fatima Saleh, suspect in Criminal Minds

See also 
 Salah (name)
 Salehi
 Mada'in Saleh, an archaeological site in Saudi Arabia

Arabic-language surnames
Arabic masculine given names
Bosniak masculine given names
Turkish masculine given names

Surnames of Jordanian origin